|}

The Grand Steeple-Chase de Paris is a Group 1 steeplechase in France which is open to horses aged five years or older. It is run at Auteuil over a distance of 6,000 metres, and during its running there are twenty-three fences to be jumped. It is the richest and most prestigious jumps race in France, and it is scheduled to take place each year in late May.

History
The event was first run on 25 May 1874, and it was initially known as the Grand National de France. It was intended to be the French equivalent of the Grand National, a famous steeplechase in England. It was originally a handicap race, and it was open to horses aged four or older. The inaugural running was contested over 6,400 metres, and this was cut to 6,000 metres in its second year. The race was given its present title, the Grand Steeple-Chase de Paris, in 1876. Its distance was extended to 6,500 metres in 1889.

The race ceased to be a handicap in 1890, when a fixed "weight-for-age" system was introduced. Four-year-old horses were required to carry 62½ kg, five-year-olds 70 kg and older horses 72½ kg. A penalty of 6 kg was incurred on the previous winners of either this race or the Grand National. The basic weights were subsequently modified several times, and the penalty was gradually reduced until it was eventually discontinued.

The Grand Steeple-Chase de Paris was abandoned throughout World War I, with no running from 1915 to 1918. Its length was increased to 6,900 metres in 1924, and then restored to 6,500 metres in 1926. During World War II it was cancelled only once, in 1940. The minimum age of participating horses was raised to five in 1941. The race's distance was reduced to 6,300 metres in 1969, but it returned to 6,500 metres in 1971. The present format, 5,800 metres with twenty-three fences, was introduced in 1981.

The three most successful horses in the race's history are Hyeres III, Katko and Mid Dancer, who have all recorded three victories. A further ten have won the event twice, most recently Docteur de Ballon in 2020 and 2021. Two winners, Jerry M and Troytown, also achieved victory in the Grand National. Twelve foreign-trained horses have won, the latest of which was Mandarin in 1962, trained in England by Fulke Walwyn. The most recent foreign contender to finish in second place was the Irish-trained Captain Christy in 1975.

Records
Leading jockey (5 wins):
 Jean Daumas – Xanthor (1959), Cousin Pons (1961), Hyeres III (1964, 1965, 1966)

Leading trainer (7 wins):
 Guillaume Macaire – Arenice (1996), Bel La Vie (2013), Storm Of Saintly (2014), So French (2016, 2017), On The Go (2018), Sel Jem (with Hector de Lageneste, 2022)

Leading owner (6 wins):
 Arthur Veil-Picard – Saint Caradec (1909), Blagueur II (1911), Ultimatum (1913), Fleuret (1935), Ingre (1937, 1939)

Winners since 1949

Earlier winners

 1874 – Miss Hungerford
 1875 – La Veine
 1876 – Ventriloque
 1877 – Congress
 1878 – Wild Monarch
 1879 – Wild Monarch
 1880 – Recruit II
 1881 – Maubourguet
 1882 – Whisper Low
 1883 – Too Good
 1884 – Varaville
 1885 – Redpath
 1886 – Boissy
 1887 – La Vigne
 1888 – Parasang
 1889 – Le Torpilleur
 1890 – Royal Meath
 1891 – Saida
 1892 – Fleurissant
 1893 – Skedaddle
 1894 – Loutch
 1895 – Styrax
 1896 – Valois
 1897 – Solitaire
 1898 – Marise
 1899 – Tancarville
 1900 – Melibee
 1901 – Calabrais
 1902 – Gratin
 1903 – Veinard
 1904 – Dandolo
 1905 – Canard
 1906 – Burgrave II
 1907 – Grosse Mere
 1908 – Dandolo
 1909 – Saint Caradec
 1910 – Jerry M
 1911 – Blagueur II
 1912 – Hopper
 1913 – Ultimatum
 1914 – Lord Loris
 1915–18 – no race
 1919 – Troytown
 1920 – Coq Gaulois
 1921 – Roi Belge
 1922 – Hertes XII
 1923 – L'Yser
 1924 – Master Bob
 1925 – Silvo
 1926 – Portmore
 1927 – The Coyote
 1928 – Maguelonne
 1929 – Le Touquet
 1930 – Le Fils de la Lune
 1931 – La Fregate
 1932 – Duc d'Anjou
 1933 – Millionnaire II
 1934 – Agitato
 1935 – Fleuret
 1936 – Potentate
 1937 – Ingre
 1938 – Heve
 1939 – Ingre
 1940 – no race
 1941 – Kerfany
 1942 – Symbole
 1943 – Kargal
 1944 – Hahnhof
 1945 – Boum
 1946 – Lindor
 1947 – Lindor
 1948 – Rideo

References
 Racing Post:

 galop.courses-france.com:
 1874–1889, 1890–1919, 1920–1949, 1950–1979, 1980–present
 france-galop.com – A Brief History: Grand Steeple-Chase de Paris.
 pedigreequery.com – Grand Steeple-Chase de Paris – Auteuil.
 tbheritage.com – Grand Steeple-Chase de Paris.
 galopp-sieger.de – Grand Steeplechase de Paris

See also
 List of French jump horse races
 Recurring events established in 1874  – this race is included under its original title, Grand National de France.

Steeplechase (horse racing)
Horse races in France
1874 establishments in France